Anett is a feminine given name. People bearing the name include:
Anett Griffel (born 1990), Estonian fashion model
Anett Györe (born 1981), Hungarian water polo player
Anett Kisfaludy (born 1990), Hungarian handball player
Anett Kontaveit (born 1995), Estonian tennis player
Anett Pötzsch (born 1960), German figure skater
Anett Schuck (born 1970), German sprint canoer
Anett Sopronyi (born 1986), Hungarian handball player
Anett Vilipuu (born 1996), Estonian footballer
Hege Anett Pettersson (born 1973), Norwegian handball player
Marie-Anett Mey (born 1971), French musician

See also
Anet (disambiguation)
Aneta (given name)
Anete
Annett (disambiguation)
Annette (disambiguation)

Hungarian feminine given names